Peter Kupferschmidt (born 2 March 1942) is a German footballer who played for Bayern Munich during the 1960s.

References

External links
 

1942 births
Living people
German footballers
Association football defenders
FC Bayern Munich footballers
SK Sturm Graz players
Kapfenberger SV players
Bundesliga players
West German footballers
West German expatriate footballers
West German expatriate sportspeople in Austria
Expatriate footballers in Austria
Hungarian-German people
Yugoslav emigrants to West Germany
People from Odžaci
Footballers from Munich